The Pembrokeshire Murders is a Welsh three-part television drama miniseries based on the Pembrokeshire murders by Welsh serial killer John Cooper. In 2006, newly promoted Detective Superintendent Steve Wilkins decided to reopen two unsolved 1980s murder cases linked with a string of burglaries. New advances in technology for forensic DNA analysis, witness reports and artists impressions of the suspect led to Dyfed-Powys Police reviewing a 1989 episode of Bullseye, which led to the serial killer finally being caught. It premiered on ITV on 11 January 2021.

The drama is the thirteenth in a series of ITV mini-series featuring notorious British murder cases of the past two centuries, following on from This Is Personal: The Hunt for the Yorkshire Ripper (2000), Shipman (2002), A Is for Acid (2002), The Brides in the Bath (2003), See No Evil: The Moors Murders (2006), Appropriate Adult (2011), Dark Angel, In Plain Sight (both 2016), Little Boy Blue (2017), Manhunt (2019), White House Farm, and Des (both 2020).

Cast
 Luke Evans as Detective Superintendent Steve Wilkins
 Keith Allen as serial killer John Cooper
 Caroline Berry as Pat Cooper, John Cooper's wife
 David Fynn as Jonathan Hill
 Oliver Ryan as Andrew Cooper
 Alexandria Riley as Detective Inspector Ella Richards
 Charles Dale as Detective Sergeant Gareth Rees
 Steven Meo as Detective Inspector Lynne Harries
 Richard Corgan as Detective Sergeant Glyn Johnson
 Kyle Lima as Detective Constable Nigel Rowe
 Steffan Cennydd as Jack Wilkins
 Anastasia Hille as Dr Angela Gallop
 Roger Evans as Detective Chief Inspector Jim Morris
 William Thomas as Detective Chief Inspector George Jones
 Suzanne Packer as Chief Constable Tyler
 Sarah Jane as Police officer
 Owen Teale as Gerard Elias QC
 Ian Saynor as Mr Justice Griffith Williams
 Rhodri Evan as Detective Chief Superintendent Coles
 Simon Nehan as Craig

Production

Development and casting
In January 2020, production began on The Pembrokeshire Murders. The series stars Luke Evans of The Great Train Robbery as Detective Superintendent Steve Wilkins, and Keith Allen as John Cooper, serial killer.

Filming
Filming wrapped just before Wales's first lockdown during the COVID-19 pandemic. Most exterior scenes were shot on location in Pembrokeshire.

Release
It was first shown on Belgium's Dutch-speaking broadcaster Eén from 29 January to 12 February 2021.

In the United States and Canada, the series will premiere on streaming service BritBox.

Episodes

Critical reception
Rebecca Nicholson, reviewing in The Guardian, described the drama as "no glory for violent, rotten crimes" and gave it four stars, while Carol Midgley for The Times described the show as "a case of too much cop and not enough killer" and gave it three stars. Ed Cummings from The Independent criticised the programme for following dramatic clichés and poor script-writing, awarding two stars.

References

External links

2020s British crime drama television series
2020s British television miniseries
2021 British television series debuts
2021 British television series endings
British serial killer films
English-language television shows
ITV television dramas
Television series by ITV Studios
Television series by World Productions
Television series set in the 1980s
Television series set in the 2000s
Television series set in 1989
Television series set in 2006
Television series set in 2007
Television series set in 2008
Television series set in 2009
Television series set in 2010
Television series set in 2011
Television shows set in Wales
True crime television series
Cultural depictions of male serial killers
Cultural depictions of British men
Films directed by Marc Evans